Chénelette is a commune in the Rhône department in eastern France. While there have been settlements in the region since before the Roman conquest of Gaul, the modern village of Chénelette first appears in records dating to the 14th century. Today it has a population of approximately 300 people.

Geography
Chénelette is a small village of approximately 300 people (2012) located in the north-west of the Rhône Department, notably in the Beaujolais region.  The surrounding landscape is one of forests, mountains (of the Massif Central), and pastures; and is frequented by hikers and outdoor enthusiasts.  The village has an elevation of 660 meters, and is located approximately 60 kilometres north-northwest of Lyon (as the crow flies) and about 375 kilometres south-south west of Paris (as the crow flies).  It lies between Roanne and Mâcon.

History
Chénelette has its roots from the Middle Ages when, in the fourteenth century, a castle was built at the peak of the Mont Tourvéon (to the east of the village) by Louis de Pieux.  Today the ruins of this castle can still be seen by climbing to the top of the mountain, which requires a considerable hike.  Chénelette has been significant to the region because it has been a point of convergence for travellers from surrounding areas.
During World War Two this region was occupied by German forces and was known for its considerable resistance.

Demographics

See also
Communes of the Rhône department

References

Communes of Rhône (department)
Beaujolais (province)